Chryseobacterium joostei  is a bacterium from the genus of Chryseobacterium which has been isolated from raw milk in Ixopo in Kwazulu-Natal in South Africa.

References

Further reading

External links
Type strain of Chryseobacterium joostei at BacDive -  the Bacterial Diversity Metadatabase

joostei
Bacteria described in 2003